The Copa Fares Lopes, is a tournament organized by Federação Cearense de Futebol every second half of the season. Its name is a homage to Fares Cândido Lopes (1934-2004), president of the Federation from 1993 to his death.

The champions qualify for the Copa do Brasil first stage.

List of champions

Titles by team

Teams in bold stills active.

By city

External links
 Editions at RSSF Brasil

Football in Ceará
Recurring sporting events established in 2010